Lakeview Public Schools may refer to:
 Lakeview Public Schools (Michigan)
 Lakeview Public Schools (Minnesota)